Dona Maria Amélia (28 September 1865 – 25 October 1951) was the last Queen consort of Portugal as the wife of Carlos I of Portugal. She was regent of Portugal during the absence of her spouse in 1895.

Early life
She was the eldest daughter of Prince Philippe, Count of Paris and Princess Marie Isabelle d'Orléans, and a "Princess of Orléans" by birth.

Amélia's paternal grandparents were Prince Ferdinand Philippe, Duke of Orléans, and Duchess Helena of Mecklenburg-Schwerin. Her maternal grandparents were Prince Antoine, Duke of Montpensier, and the Infanta Luisa Fernanda of Spain. The Dukes of Orléans and Montpensier were siblings, both sons of Louis-Philippe I, King of the French, and Maria Amalia of the Two Sicilies.

Marriage and issue
On 22 May 1886, Amélia married Carlos, Prince Royal of Portugal. He was the eldest son of King Luís I of Portugal and Maria Pia of Savoy. He was at the time the heir apparent to the throne. The bride was almost twenty-one years old and the groom about twenty-three. The marriage had been arranged by their families after several attempts to arrange a marriage for her with a member of the Austrian or Spanish dynasties. At first, the marriage was not popular and Queen Maria Pia was expecting to marry Carlos to Archduchess Marie Valerie of Austria, Princess Mathilde of Saxony, Princess Viktoria of Prussia or Princess Victoria of Wales. However, Amélia and Carlos came to live quite harmoniously with each other.

They had three children:

 Luís Filipe, Duke of Braganza (21 March 1887 – 1 February 1908).
 Infanta Maria Anna of Portugal (born and deceased on 14 December 1887).
 Manuel II of Portugal (15 November 1889 – 2 July 1932).

Queen consort

On 19 October 1889, King Luís died and Carlos succeeded him on the throne. Amélia became the new Queen consort of Portugal. However her husband became known for his extramarital affairs while the popularity of the Portuguese monarchy started to wane in the face of a bankrupt economy, industrial disturbances, socialist and republican antagonism and press criticism.

Amélia played an active role as a queen, and somewhat softened the growing criticism towards the monarchy with her personal popularity, though she did receive some criticism for her expenses. She was active in many social projects, such as the prevention and treatment of tuberculosis and the foundation of charity organisations, sanatoriums and drugstores. She was considered less formal than her mother-in-law Maria Pia, learned Portuguese well and was described as calm and mild. She was interested in literature, opera and theatre, was a diarist and also painted. During the absence of her spouse in 1895, she acted as regent. In 1902, she made a cruise on the Mediterranean Sea that was much criticised for its luxury.

In 1892, Pope Leo XIII gave a Golden Rose to Amélia.

Queen dowager

On 1 February 1908, the royal family returned from the palace of Vila Viçosa to Lisbon. They travelled in the royal train to Barreiro and from there took a boat to cross the Tagus River. They disembarked at Cais das Colunas in the principal square of downtown Lisbon, the Terreiro do Paço. On their way to the Palace of Necessidades, the carriage carrying Carlos and his family passed through the Rua do Arsenal. While crossing the square and turning to the street, several shots were fired from the crowd by at least two men (Alfredo Luís da Costa and Manuel Buiça), among others. The King died immediately, his heir Prince Dom Luís was mortally wounded and Infante Dom Manuel was hit in the arm, yet Queen Amélie was surprisingly unharmed after trying to defend her youngest son, the new king Manuel II, with the flower bouquet she kept in her hand.

The two assassins were shot on the spot by members of the royal bodyguard and later were recognized as members of the Portuguese Republican Party and of their masonic left-wing organisation Carbonária. About twenty minutes later, Prince Luis Filipe died and the next day Manuel was acclaimed King of Portugal, the last of the Braganza dynasty.

Manuel II of Portugal was deposed by a military coup, later known as the 5 October 1910 revolution, which resulted in the establishment of the Portuguese First Republic. Queen Amélie left Portugal with the rest of the royal family and went into exile. She lived most of her remaining life in France. During World War II the Portuguese government invited her to return to Portugal, but she declined the offer. She visited Portugal for the last time in 1945.

Honours
 Dame Grand Cross of the Royal Order of the Immaculate Conception of Vila Viçosa (House of Braganza)
 Dame Grand Cross with Collar of the Royal Order of Christ (House of Braganza)
 Dame Grand Cross of the Sash of the Three Orders, 9 May 1909 (House of Braganza)
 7th Grand Mistress Dame Grand Cross of the Royal Order of Queen Saint Isabel, Special Class (House of Braganza)
 Dame of the Imperial and Royal Order of the Starry Cross, 1st Class (Austrian Imperial and Royal Family)
 Dame Grand Cross of Obedience of the Sovereign Military Order of Malta
 867th Dame Grand Cross of the Order of Queen Maria Luisa, 25 October 1886 (Kingdom of Spain)
 Dame Grand Cordon of the Imperial Order of Saint Catherine, 1895 (Russian Imperial Family)

Ancestry

References

External links

Queen Amelia of Portugal

1865 births
1951 deaths
House of Braganza-Saxe-Coburg and Gotha
Portuguese queens consort
Princesses of France (Orléans)
Burials at the Monastery of São Vicente de Fora
Princesses Royal of Portugal
Duchesses of Braganza
3
3
3
Knights Grand Cross of the Order of the Immaculate Conception of Vila Viçosa
Dames of the Order of Saint Isabel
19th-century French people
20th-century French people
19th-century French women
20th-century French women
19th-century Portuguese people
19th-century Portuguese women
20th-century Portuguese people
20th-century Portuguese women
19th-century women rulers
Children of Prince Philippe, Count of Paris
Queen mothers